The Radio Televisión Canaria is the Canary Islands regional television and radio channel, based on Santa Cruz de Tenerife. It is currently managed by 2015 Canary Islands autonomy law.  

In 2018, a political crisis nearly lead to its disappearance. The new law regulating it was approved on the same year.

See also 

 Canary Islands
 RTVE

References

External links 

 Main site

Publicly funded broadcasters
1999 establishments in Spain
State media